Watervale may refer to:
 Watervale, South Australia, a town in the Clare Valley, approximately 9 kilometres north of Auburn
 Watervale, Michigan, a former lumber town now a National Historic Site
 Watervale, New York, an unincorporated hamlet in Onondaga County, New York, USA
Watervale, Nova Scotia Canada 
Watervale (horse), winner of the 1911 Preakness Stakes